Tatyana Vasilyevna Kalmykova (born January 10, 1990) is a female Russian race walker. She represented Russia at the 2008 Summer Olympics in Beijing, and competed in the women's 20 km race walk, along with her teammates Tatyana Sibileva and Olga Kaniskina, who eventually won the gold medal for this event. In spite of tumultuous rains, Kalmykova did not hinder her chances of racing around a 20 km walk; however, she received a final warning (a total of three red cards) for not following the proper form during the 14 km lap, and was subsequently disqualified.

Kalmykova had won gold medal for the 10 km race walk (junior division) at the 2008 IAAF World Race Walking Cup in Cheboksary. She also defended two titles and set world junior records for the 5 km track walk at the IAAF World Youth Championships in 2005 and in 2007.

References

External links

NBC Olympics Profile

Living people
1990 births
Russian female racewalkers
Olympic female racewalkers
Olympic athletes of Russia
Athletes (track and field) at the 2008 Summer Olympics
Russian Athletics Championships winners